Denmark imports but does not produce nuclear energy, which is in accordance with a 1985 law passed by the Danish parliament, prohibiting power production from nuclear energy in Denmark. In 2014 and 2015, (imported) nuclear power was 3-4% of electricity consumption in Denmark.

Instead, the country has focused on renewable energy sources such as wind energy to reduce the country's dependence on coal power. In 2007, about 11.4 TWh of electricity was exported and 10.4 TWh imported. Import from Sweden amounted 5 TWh, from Norway 3.9 TWh, and from Germany 1.5 TWh. Both Sweden and Germany have a portion of nuclear energy in their power production.

Beginning in 2003, three nuclear research reactors at the former Risø National Laboratory have been shut down, and are in the process of being dismantled. The reactors were named DR-1, DR-2 and DR-3, and had the following properties:

References

Energy in Denmark
Denmark
Nuclear power in Europe by country
Nuclear technology in Denmark